Eulepidotis reducens is a moth of the family Erebidae first described by Harrison Gray Dyar Jr. in 1914. It is found in the Neotropics, including Venezuela.

References

External links
Original description: 

Moths described in 1914
reducens